Mel's Hole is, according to an urban legend, a "bottomless pit" near Ellensburg, Washington. Claims about it were first made on the radio show Coast to Coast AM by a guest calling himself Mel Waters. Later investigation revealed no such person was listed as residing in that area, and no credible evidence has been given that the hole ever existed.

Description 
The legend of the bottomless hole started on February 21, 1997, when a man identifying himself as Mel Waters appeared as a guest on Coast to Coast AM with Art Bell. According to Waters, the hole had an unknown depth. He claimed to have measured its depth using fishing line and a weight, although he still had not hit bottom by the time  of line had been used. He also claimed that his neighbor's dead dog had been seen alive sometime after it was thrown into the hole. According to Waters, the hole's magical properties prompted US federal agents to seize the land and fund his relocation to Australia.

Waters made guest appearances on Bell's show in 1997, 2000, and 2002. Rebroadcasts of those appearances have helped create what has been described as a "modern, rural myth". The exact location of the hole was unspecified, yet several people claimed to have seen it, such as Gerald R. Osborne, who used the ceremonial name Red Elk, who described himself as an "intertribal medicine man...half-breed Native American / white", and who told reporters in 2012 he visited the hole many times since 1961 and claimed the US government maintained a top secret base there where "alien activity" occurs. But in 2002, Osborne was unable to find the hole on an expedition of 30 people he was leading.

Local news reporters who investigated the claims found no public records of anyone named Mel Waters ever residing in, or owning property in Kittitas County. According to State Department of Natural Resources geologist Jack Powell, the hole does not exist and is geologically impossible. A hole of the depth claimed "would collapse into itself under the tremendous pressure and heat from the surrounding strata," said Powell. Powell said an ordinary old mine shaft on private property was probably the inspiration for the stories, and commented that Mel's Hole had established itself as a legend "based on no evidence at all".

"Aspects of Mel's Hole" art exhibit 
An art exhibition, "Aspects of Mel's Hole: Artists Respond to a Paranormal Land Event Occurring in Radiospace," curated by LA Weekly art critic Doug Harvey, was presented at the Grand Central Art Center in Santa Ana, California in 2008. The show featured works by 41 artists and collectives, many created specifically for the exhibition, including works by Albert Cuellar, Charles Schneider, Marnie Weber, Jim Shaw, Jeffrey Vallance, Georganne Deen, Paul Laffoley, The Firesign Theatre, Gary Panter, The Center for Land Use Interpretation, James Hayward, Cathy Ward, Eric Wright and Craig Stecyk. The GCAC published a hardbound 146-page catalog in conjunction with the exhibit, containing contributions from all the artists, plus essays by Harvey, psychoanalyst Judy Spence, science author Margaret Wertheim, Hannah Miller, Brian Tucker, Christine Wertheim, Mike Mcgee and the Rev. Ethan Acres.

See also 
Devils Hole, a fissure with branches that connect to a  cavern in a geologically active part of Nevada
Well to Hell hoax
The Hole, a 2009 fantasy film containing many elements of the legend
Skinwalker Ranch, a similar paranormal "complex" (combining several different kinds of Fortean accounts in one location)

References

External links 
Audio clips of the original two shows featuring Mel Waters
Mel Waters' guest page on Coast to Coast AM
Manastash Ridge, mentioned by Waters as being in the vicinity of the alleged hole, is at coordinates 
Tri-City Herald story on Mel's Hole
2002 Seattle Times article about an expedition to Mel's Hole 
Grand Central Art Center's "Aspects of Mel's Hole: Artists Respond to a Paranormal Land Event Occurring in Radiospace" exhibit.
Eastern Washington hole is shrouded in mystery by Denise Whitaker, Published: Feb 7, 2012 at 11:33 PM PST, Last Updated: Feb 12, 2012 at 11:24 AM PST.
Getting to the bottom of Mel's Hole Ellensburg Daily Record, March 31, 2012

Cascadian folklore
Coast to Coast AM
Forteana
Hollow Earth
Kittitas County, Washington
Urban legends